The World Bowls Tour is an international organisation which promotes indoor bowls worldwide and organises competitions, including the World Indoor Bowls Championships with other bowls associations. Its parent organisation is the Professional Bowls Association.

History
On 1 January 1997, under the then chairman Richard Corsie, the PBA created the World Bowls Tour (WBT) and after the 1997 championship replaced the World Indoor Bowls Council as the leading indoor organisation. The purpose of the World Bowls Tour was to set up and create championships and competitions to further the aims of the PBA.

Events

 World Indoor Bowls Championships (main event)
 The International Open
 Scottish International Open
 Welsh International Open
 World Matchplay

Awards
World Bowls Tour Awards

References

 
Bowls
International sports organizations
Sports competition series